Phanera coccinea is the type species of the genus Phanera: a "climbing shrub" in the subfamily Cercidoideae and the tribe Bauhinieae, the genus having been separated from Bauhinia.  Under its synonym Bauhinia coccinea, its  Vietnamese names include "quạch" and "mấu".  Records of distribution exist from the subtropical and tropical forests of Indochina (Cambodia, Laos, Vietnam) and South-central China.

Accepted infraspecifics

Plants of the World Online lists:
 P. coccinea subsp. coccinea
 P. coccinea subsp. tonkinensis (Gagnep.) Mackinder & R.Clark (Yunnan, Indochina)

References

External Links

Cercidoideae
Flora of Indo-China
Fabales of Asia